Tlokoeng Airport  is an airport serving the village of Tlokoeng in Mokhotlong District, Lesotho.

See also
Transport in Lesotho
List of airports in Lesotho

References

External links
OurAirports - Tlokoeng
OpenStreetMap - Tlokoeng
 Tlokoeng Airport
 Google Earth

Airports in Lesotho